This is list of archives in Mexico.

Archives in Mexico 
 
 
Archivo General de la Nación, Mexico City
 
Archivo Histórico del Distrito Federal
Archivo Histórico del Instituto Nacional de Arqueología e Historia
Archivo Histórico de Notarías
Archivo de Instrumentos Públicos, Guadalajara
Biblioteca Pública del Estado de Jalisco
Archivo del Arzobispado de Guadalajara
Archivo Histórico de la Provincia Franciscana, Zapopan
 Carso Center for the Study of Mexican History
Archivo General de Notarías del Estado de Jalisco, Toluca

See also 

 List of libraries in Mexico
 List of museums in Mexico
 Culture of Mexico
 Portal de Archivos Españoles (federated search of archives in Spain)

External links 

 
Mexico
Archives
Archives